RHI may refer to:

 Renewable Heat Incentive, a payment system in the United Kingdom from 2011
 RHI Entertainment, former name of the American entertainment company; Halcyon Studios, LLC. 
 Rhinelander-Oneida County Airport, IATA code RHI
 Rhiwbina railway station, Cardiff, Wales; National Rail station code RHI
 Robert Half International
 Roller Hockey International
 RHI AG, an Austrian manufacturing company